The second season of the Australian competitive cooking competition show My Kitchen Rules premiered on the Seven Network on 31 January 2011.

Teams

Elimination history

Competition details

Instant Restaurants
During the Instant Restaurant rounds, each team hosts a three-course dinner for judges and fellow teams in their allocated group. They are scored and ranked among their group, with the lowest scoring team from each group competing in a Sudden Death Cook-Off, where one team is eliminated.

Round 1
 Episodes 1 to 6
 Airdate — 31 January to 9 February
 Description — The first of the two instant restaurant groups are introduced into the competition in Round 1. At the end of the round, the lowest scoring team goes to Sudden Death, with a risk of being eliminated.

Round 2
 Episodes 7 to 12
 Airdate – 14 February to 23 February
 Description – The second group now start their Instant Restaurant round. The same rules from the previous round apply and the lowest scoring team goes to Sudden Death, with a chance of being eliminated.

Sudden Death Cook-off
 Episode 12
 Airdate – 23 February
 Description – The two lowest scoring teams from each Instant Restaurant round will now compete in a cook-off, with the lowest-scoring team being eliminated.

Top 11

People's Choice Challenge: Street Party
 Episode 13
 Airdate - 28 February 2011
 Description - This is the first People's Choice Challenge. While Sammy & Bella, Bill & Alex are immuned for being on top of the leader board in the Instant Restaurant Challenge, the 9 teams left have to cook for an annual street party. Each team has to cook in the resident house and can choose to cook either sweet or savoury dishes. The team with the most votes from the residents who enjoy the party will be People's Choice and get immuned from the Kitchen HQ. The team with the weakest dish decides by Pete & Manu will join the Sudden Death Cook-off.

Kitchen Cook off
 Episode 14
 Airdate - 1 March 2011
 Description - After the People's Choice, beside Bill & Alex, Sammy & Bella and Mal & Bec. The rest teams has to join the Kitchen Headquarter. Each team has to cook a dish with meat and 3 types of vegetable. However, the rule changes and all the ingredients must be in a pie and have to make it in 1 hour left. The team with the weakest dish chosen by Pete and Manu will join the Sudden Death Cook-off with Artie & Johnie.

Sudden Death 
 Episode 15
 Airdate – 2 March 2011
 Description – Artie & Johnnie compete against Donna & Reade. Each team has to cook a 3-course meal for the judges. The team with the lower score from the judges will be eliminated from the competition.

Top 10

People's Choice Challenge: Channel 7 Studios Breakfast
 Episode 16
 Airdate - 7 March 2011
 Description - Top 10 has to cook breakfast for all the employees and celebrities who are working in Channel 7 Studio. The team with the most votes from everyone who enjoy the breakfast will be People's Choice and get immuned from the Kitchen HQ. The team with the weakest dish decides by Pete & Manu will join the Sudden Death Cook-off.

Kitchen HQ: Lunch Challenge
 Episode 17
 Airdate - 8 March 2011
 Description - In the Kitchen Cook-off, teams have 30 minutes to impress the judges by cooking a Gourmet sandwich dish for lunch. However, only one person in the team can cook and the other person sit out and not allowed to guide the cook. The 4 teams with the weaker dishes than the others will join in the 2nd round. In the Showdown, teams have to use the minimum of 3 ingredients in the sandwich to make a soup dish in 45 minutes. The team with the weakest dish in the second round will join the Sudden Death Cook-off with Mal & Bec.

Sudden Death 
 Episode 18
 Airdate – 9 March 2011
 Description – Mal & Bec compete against Bill & Alex. Each team has to cook a 3-course meal for the judges. The team with the lower score from the judges will be eliminated from the competition.

Top 9

People’s Choice Challenge: Children Festival 
 Episode 19
 Airdate - 14 March 2011
 Description - Top 9 has to cook for hundred thousand people who attend the Sydney's Children Festival. All the food has to be suitable and delicious for both kids and adults. Teams have 1 hour to cook and 90 minutes to serve. The team with the most votes from the public will be People's Choice and get immuned from the Kitchen HQ. The team with the weakest dish decides by Pete & Manu will be straight into the Sudden Death Cook-off.

 Note:
 – The dish included Chocolate Sauce before, but they decided not to use it because it kept burning.

Kitchen HQ
 Episode 20
 Airdate - 15 March 2011
 Description - In the Kitchen Cook-off, teams have 30 minutes to impress the judges by cooking a pasta dish from scratch. However, the person who cooked in the last Kitchen Cook-off has to sit out and not allowed to cook. The 4 teams with the weaker dishes than the others will join in the 2nd round. In the Showdown, teams have to make a dessert with the ingredients: egg and flour for 90 minutes. The team with the weakest dish in the second round will join the Sudden Death Cook-off with Artie & Johnny.

Sudden Death 
 Episode 21
 Airdate – 16 March 2011
 Description – Artie & Johnnie compete against Bill & Alex. Each team has to cook a 3-course meal for the judges. The team with the lower score from the judges will be eliminated from the competition.

Top 8

People’s Choice Challenge: Outdoor Picnic 
 Episode 22
 Airdate - 21 March 2011
 Description - Top 8 has to cook for picnickers who attend the Sydney International Food Festival. Each team has to cook 20 picnic plates including 3 dishes that involves a salad dish and a dish that can be eaten cold. Teams have 90 minutes to cook in the Kitchen HQ. The team with the most votes from the public will be People's Choice and get immuned from the Kitchen HQ Challenge. The team with the weakest dish decides by Pete & Manu will be straight into the Sudden Death Cook-off.

Kitchen HQ
 Episode 23
 Airdate - 15 March 2011
 Description- In the Kitchen Cook-off, teams have to make a canapé in 30 minutes. However, teams are separate. The first person will cook in the first 15 minutes and the second one will cook in the last 15 minutes and two people are not allowed to see each other cooking. Only 2 teams are saved after this Cook-off and the four left have to cook in the Showdown. In the showdown, teams have an hour to make a dish that is composed of a classing flavour pairing. The team with the weakest dish will join the Sudden Death Cook-off against Melanie & James.

Sudden Death 
 Episode 24
 Airdate – 16 March 2011
 Description – Melanie & James compete against Kane & Lee. Each team has to cook a 3-course meal for the judges. The team with the lower score from the judges will be eliminated from the competition.

Top 7: Outback North Territory Adventure

Round 1
 Episode 25
 Airdate - 28 March 2011
 Description - This is the first round of the NT Adventure. In the first round, teams will have to cook a damper and make the sauce for the damper in 30 minutes . The team with the best dish will be immuned from the whole adventure. In the second round, teams have to cook for cattle farmers: 2 cook Entrée, 2 cook Main and 2 cook Dessert. The team with the most votes from the public will be People's Choice and don't have to cook in the next challenge. The team with the weakest dish decided by Pete & Manu will be straight into the Sudden Death Cook-off.

Round 2
 Episode 26
 Airdate - 29 March 2011
 Description- 4 teams left have to cook lunch for passengers on the Ghan Train. Teams have to cook Main and Dessert and the teams that cooked Dessert in the previous round will cook Main. Each team has to cook their dishes in 90 minutes. The weakest team will be sent to Sudden Death by Pete and Manu.

Round 3 
 Episode 27
 Airdate – 30 March 2011
 Description - This is the Sudden Death between Kelly & Ash and Kane & Lee. However, Kelly & Ash have to withdraw from the competition due to a medical issue. All teams have to cook instead. Teams are divided to cook a three-course meal. Two teams will cook one course and the dish has to include a Darwin products: Mud Crab (Entrée), Barramundi (Main) and Tropical Fruit (Dessert). After the Cook-off, the winner team will be safe from the nest elimination round.

Top 6
 Episode 28
 Airdate - 4 April 2011

Urban Challenge: Chinese Banquet
 Description- Apart Sammy & Bella, who won the last challenge, teams have to cook Chinese dishes. The judges include Pete, Manu and the China Town Top Restauranteer. Teams have 60 minites to cook their food. However, their shopping time will effect their cooking time: the faster you arrive the restaurant, the sooner you cook. There will be no People's Choice in this challenge. Two teams with the weakest dishes will go to Sudden Death Cook-off

Sudden Death
 Description- After the Urban Challenge, Daniela & Stefania compete against Esther & Ali in the Sudden Death. Teams have 90 minutes to cook their signature dish. The team with the weaker dish decided by Pete & Manu will be eliminated.

Top 5

Kitchen HQ
 Episode 29
 Airdate - 5 April 2011
 Description- In the first round, teams have to cook international prawn dish in 30 minutes. The team with the weakest dish will be straight through the Sudden Death. In the second round, teams have to cook dishes that represent the cultural chosen in the first round in 60 minutes. Team with the weakest dish will compete against Anne-Marie and Nick in the Sudden Death while the others were in the Semi-finals.

Sudden Death 
 Episode 30
 Airdate – 6 April 2011
 Description – Anne-Marie & Nick compete against Bill & Alex. Each team has to cook a 3-course meal for the judges. The team will the higher score will be in the Semifinals. The team with the lower score from the judges will be eliminated from the competition.

Semi-finals

Semi-final 1
 Episode 31
 Airdate – 11 April 2011
 Description – Sammy & Bella compete against Daniela & Stefania in the first Semifinal. Each team has to cook a 3-course meal for the judges. The team will the higher score will have their spot in the Grand Final with the opportunity to win $250,000.

Semi-final 2
 Episode 32
 Airdate – 12 April 2011
 Description – Kane & Lee compete against Anne-Marie & Nick in the second Semifinal. Each team has to cook a 3-course meal for the judges. The team will the higher score will have their spot in the Grand Final against Sammy & Bella with the opportunity to win $250,000.

Grand Finale
 Episode 33
 Airdate — 13 April 2011 
 Description — Each finalist cooked a five-course meal, with 20 plates per course for the eliminated teams, friends and family. The guest judges then scored their dishes for a final verdict.

Ratings
 Colour Key:
  – Highest Rating
  – Lowest Rating
  – Elimination Episode
  – Finals Week

References

External links
 Official site

2011 Australian television seasons
My Kitchen Rules